State Highway 65 (SH 65) is a Texas state route that runs for  within Chambers County, from near Anahuac to Stowell.  This route was designated on December 30, 1961, replacing a portion of SH 73 identified as SH 73-T.

History

Previous route
SH 65 was originally designated on August 21, 1923 along a route from Mt. Pleasant to Gladewater, replacing part of SH 11. On September 26, 1939, this route was cancelled as it was part of U.S. Highway 271, which it was cosigned with since 1935.

Junction list

References

065
Transportation in Chambers County, Texas